General Drake may refer to:

Charles Bryant Drake (1872–1956), U.S. Army brigadier general
Charles C. Drake (1887–1984), U.S. Army brigadier general
Clifford B. Drake (1918–1994), U.S. Marine Corps major general
Francis M. Drake (1830–1903), U.S. Army brigadier general

See also
Edmund Drake-Brockman (1884–1949), Australian Army major general